The 1995–96 season of the Montserrat Championship was the third recorded season of top flight association football competition in Montserrat, with records for any competition held between 1975 and 1995 not available. Police won the championship, their second championship following their victory in the inaugural competition in 1974.

References

1995 domestic association football leagues
1996 domestic association football leagues
1995 in Montserrat
1996 in Montserrat
Montserrat Championship seasons